Unterwegs nach Atlantis (translation: On the Way to Atlantis) is an Austrian-German-Swiss-Czechoslovakian science fiction television series from 1981.

See also
List of German television series

External links
 

1980s Czechoslovak television series
1982 German television series debuts
1982 German television series endings
1982 Czechoslovak television series debuts
1982 Czechoslovak television series endings
German science fiction television series
German children's television series
ZDF original programming